Chacayán District is one of eight districts of the province Daniel Alcides Carrión in Peru.

See also 
 Kuntuyuq
 Yuraq Mach'ay

References